Celestine Joseph Damiano (November 1, 1911 – October 2, 1967) was an American prelate of the Roman Catholic Church. He served as apostolic delegate to South Africa (1953–1960) and as bishop of the Diocese of Camden in New Jersey (1960–1967).

Biography

Early life 
The oldest of six children, Celestine Damiano was born in 1911 in Dunkirk, New York, to Vito and Stella (née Zaccari) Damiano, who were Italian immigrants. Receiving his early education at public schools in Dunkirk, he studied at St. Michael's College in Toronto, Ontario, for two years.  Damiano then entered the Urban College of the Propaganda in Rome, where he studied philosophy and theology.

Damiano was ordained to the priesthood on December 21, 1935. He then did pastoral work in Buffalo and Niagara New York until 1947, when he became an official of the Congregation for the Propagation of the Faith in Rome.

Apostolic delegate to South Africa 
On November 27, 1952, Damiano was appointed apostolic delegate to South Africa and titular archbishop of Nicopolis in Epiro by Pope Pius XII. He received his episcopal consecration on February 11, 1953 from Bishop Joseph A. Burke, with Archbishop John O'Hara and Bishop Leo Smith serving as co-consecrators, at Saint Joseph's Cathedral in Buffalo.  Damiano was highly influential in changing the face of the local church in South Africa, where he became a vocal opponent of the government's apartheid policies.

Archbishop of Camden 
Following the death of Bishop Justin J. McCarthy in December 1959, Damiano was named the third bishop of the Diocese of Camden in New Jersey (with the personal title of archbishop) on January 24, 1960. He was installed at the Cathedral of the Immaculate Conception in Camden on May 3, 1960.

Schools 
In September 1960, Damiano launched a drive to raise $5 million for the construction and improvement of Catholic secondary schools in the diocese. He established the following high schools in New Jersey:

 Camden Catholic High School in Cherry Hill 
 Holy Spirit High School in Absecon
 Paul VI High School in Haddonfield  

Damiano also opened 17 new elementary schools in the diocese, with total enrollment for all schools increasing by more than 3,000. He also founded a diocesan school board in 1965, and greatly expanded the Confraternity of Christian Doctrine.

Social welfare 
Damiano was also concerned with the welfare of the 25,000 Puerto Ricans living in his diocese, and established the Spanish Catholic Center at Vineland in 1962. Damiano initiated the diocese's Brazil mission project in 1961, and the House of Charity Appeal for funding diocesan human services in 1964. He was a member of the Central Preparatory Commission in Rome and attended all four sessions of the Second Vatican Council (1962-1965). He delivered the invocation for the 1964 Democratic National Convention in Atlantic City, New Jersey. In 1966, Damiano established a new rule allow interracial weddings in diocese churches without permission from the diocese.  Previously, these couples were married only in church rectories.

Death
On October 2, 1967, while recuperating from gall bladder surgery, Damiano died at age 55 from a thrombus at Our Lady of Lourdes Hospital in Camden. He is buried at Calvary Cemetery in Cherry Hill, New Jersey.

References

1911 births
1967 deaths
People from Dunkirk, New York
American people of Italian descent
Apostolic Nuncios to South Africa
20th-century American Roman Catholic titular archbishops
Roman Catholic bishops in New Jersey
Participants in the Second Vatican Council
20th-century Roman Catholic bishops in the United States
Roman Catholic Diocese of Camden
Catholics from New York (state)
Burials in New Jersey